Coptops humerosa is a species of beetle in the family Cerambycidae. It was described by Fairmaire in 1871, originally as C. humerosus. It is known from Seychelles.

References

humerosa
Beetles described in 1871